The 1999 World Single Distance Speed Skating Championships were held between 12 and 14 March 1999 in the Thialf, Heerenveen, Netherlands.

Schedule

Medal summary

Men's events

Women's events

Medal table

References

1999 World Single Distance
World Single Distance Speed Skating Championships
World Single Distance, 1999
World Single Distance Speed Skating Championships
World Single Distance Speed Skating Championships, 1999